The banknotes of the Japanese yen are part of the physical form of Japan's currency. Modern banknotes were first released by the Bank of Japan in 1885, three years after the Japanese government established a centralized bank. Throughout their history, the denominations have ranged from 0.05 yen to 10,000 yen. All of notes worth more than 1 yen, and printed since 1946 are still legal tender.

Currently, portraits of people from the Meiji period and later are printed on Japanese banknotes. The reason for this is that from the point of view of preventing counterfeiting, it is desirable to use an accurate photograph as the original for a portrait, rather than a painting.

Meiji era

1885–1887

1888–1891

1899–1900

1910

Taishō era

1915–1917

Shōwa era

1946–1948

1950–1953

Series B introduced a new high value banknote ¥1000.

1957–1969

The series C introduced two new high value banknotes ¥5000 and ¥10,000.

1984

Due to the discovery of a large number of counterfeit Series D banknotes at the end of 2004, all Series D banknotes except ¥2000 were virtually suspended on January 17, 2005, and officially suspended on April 2, 2007. According to a news release  from the National Police Agency, they seized 11,717 counterfeit Series D banknotes (excluding the ¥2000 denomination) in 2005. However, they seized only 486 counterfeit current issue banknotes, namely Series E ¥1000, ¥5000, ¥10,000, and Series D ¥2000.

Heisei era

2000

This is the current issue. The 2000 yen note was first issued on July 19, 2000 to commemorate the 26th G8 summit in Okinawa and the 2000 millennium year as well. Pictured on the front of the note is Shureimon, a famous gate in Naha, Okinawa near the site of the summit. The other side features a scene from The Tale of Genji and the author Murasaki Shikibu on the lower right corner. The motif of the scene was taken from the 12th century illuminated handscrolls of the novel kept at the Tokugawa Art Museum in Nagoya. The image of Murasaki Shikibu is taken from the Gotoh edition of the Murasaki Shikibu Diary Emaki held at the Gotoh Museum.

Many Japanese consider the 2000 yen note a novelty as it is the only Japanese denomination whose first digit is 2. To promote the circulation of the notes, some companies had started paying wages in them. The series D is the first to display the EURion constellation.

2004

This is the current issue. The EURion constellation pattern can be observed on the series E.

Reiwa era

2024

On April 9, 2019, Finance Minister Tarō Asō announced new designs for the ¥1000, ¥5000, and ¥10,000 notes, for use beginning in 2024. The ¥1000 bill will feature Kitasato Shibasaburō and The Great Wave off Kanagawa, the ¥5000 bill will feature Tsuda Umeko and wisteria flowers, and the ¥10,000 bill will feature Shibusawa Eiichi and Tokyo Station.

References

External links

 List of banknotes valid in Japan
 Currency Museum of the Bank of Japan
 Museum of Bank notes and Coins